Howrah Sangha Adarsha Balika Vidyalaya is an English-medium school located in Howrah, India. This is a girls' school and is affiliated to the West Bengal Board of Secondary Education for Madhyamik Pariksha (10th Board exams), and to the West Bengal Council of Higher Secondary Education for Higher Secondary Examination (12th Board exams).

See also
Education in India
List of schools in India
Education in West Bengal

References

External links

Girls' schools in West Bengal
High schools and secondary schools in West Bengal
Schools in Howrah district
Educational institutions in India with year of establishment missing